Ilisha africana, called the West African ilisha, is a species of longfin herring native to the coasts, lagoons and estuaries of western Africa from Senegal to Angola. It prefers shallow waters, and is unlikely to be found below 25 m. Some individuals can reach 30 cm, with the average closer to 18 cm.

The species is commercially fished, with 32,815 t landed in 2008.

References

External links
 
 

Pristigasteridae
Commercial fish
Marine fauna of West Africa
Fish described in 1795